Headgit is first EP by the British rock band Githead. It was released in 2004.

Track listing
"Reset" – 4:00
"Fake Corpses" – 3:38
"To Have & to Hold" – 3:53
"Craft Is Dead" – 3:40
"Profile" – 3:38
"12 Buildings" – 2:31

Personnel
 Colin Newman - vocals, guitar
 Malka Spigel - bass, vocals
 Robin Rimbaud - guitar

References

2004 EPs
Githead albums
Swim (record label) albums